Michael Oldisworth (1591–1664) was an English politician who sat in the House of Commons variously between 1624 and 1653. He supported the Parliamentary side in the English Civil War.

Oldisworth was the son of Arnold Oldsworth and his wife Lucy Barty daughter of Francis Barty of Antwerp. He was a fellow of Magdalen College, Oxford, and became secretary to the 3rd and 4th Earls of Pembroke. He  entered parliament in the interest of the Earls.

In 1624 Oldisworth became Member of Parliament for Old Sarum after Sir Arthur Ingram chose to sit for York instead. He was re-elected MP for Old Sarum in 1625, 1626 and 1628 and sat until 1629 when King Charles decided to rule without parliament for eleven years.

In April 1640, Oldisworth was elected MP  for Salisbury in the Short Parliament. In November 1640 he was returned as MP for Salisbury and Plympton Erle and chose to sit for Salisbury. His patron was a puritan and had broken with the King, and Oldisworth continued to support the parliamentarian cause. He was appointed keeper of Windsor Great Park in 1650 and master of the prerogative office. He was satirised by royalist pamphleteers and praised by Herrick.

Oldisworth married Jane Thomas, widow of William Thomas and daughter of Sir John Stradling, 1st Baronet.

References

 

 

1591 births
1659 deaths
Roundheads
People from Salisbury
Alumni of Magdalen College, Oxford
Year of death uncertain
Members of the Parliament of England for Plympton Erle
English MPs 1624–1625
English MPs 1625
English MPs 1626
English MPs 1628–1629
English MPs 1640 (April)
English MPs 1640–1648